General Blake may refer to:

David Blake (general) (1887–1965), Australian Army major general
Gordon Blake (1910–1997), U.S. Air Force lieutenant general
Harold Henry Blake (1883–1960), British Army major general
Joaquín Blake (1759–1827), Spanish Army captain general
Robert Blake (admiral) (1598–1657), Commonwealth Navy General at Sea
Robert Blake (USMC) (1894–1983), U.S. Marine Corps major general